Òrànmíyanjú (Literal meaning: "My problem is solved") Omoluabi Odede, Great Prince of Ife, King of the Yoruba, also known as Ọranyan, was a Yoruba king from the kingdom of Ile-Ife. Although he was the youngest, he became the prime heir of Oduduwa upon his return to claim his grandfather's throne.

According to Yoruba history, he founded Oyo as its first Alaafin in the year 1300 after he had left Benin where he had been crowned the first Oba of Benin.
Following the Oba Oranyan's death, his family is fabled to have erected the commemorative stele known as the Staff of Oranmiyan - Opa Oranmiyan in the Yoruba language - at the place where their grandfather died. This obelisk Is 5.5m tall and about 1.2m in circumference at its base. During a storm in 1884 about 1.2m was broken off from its top and it has fallen down twice and been re-erected on each occasion. It currently stands in a grove in Mopa, Ile-Ife. Radiocarbon tests have shown that this royal marker was erected centuries before the start of the Oduduwa dynasty.

Early life 

Not much is known about Oranmiyan's childhood and most of the information about his early life comes from Ife sources. He is called a man of two fathers - Oduduwa and Ogun - who both had relations with his mother Lakange Anihunka (a slave captured by Ogun in one of his war expeditions).
The legend further compounds the controversy by stating that Oranmiyan was two-tone in complexion: half his body was light-skinned (like Ogun's), while the other half was ebony-black (like Oduduwa's). Due to this, he was given the name Oranmiyan (or Oran ni Omo ni yan, which means "The child has chosen to be controversial"). His other name Odede signifies a great hunter, something which he was known to be throughout his early life in Ife. He was also a great warrior like his two fathers. He was the first Odole Oduduwa (youth of the house of oduduwa) as he was a strong and outspoken prince of the Oduduwa lineage. His strength and talent in battle made him take up the role of defending Ife - which had no standing military at the time - as the first Akogun of Ife.

Oranmiyan at Benin 

The  Ooni of Ife at the time sent his son Oranmiyan to  Igodomigodo. Oranmiyan camped at a place called Use, meaning "making of a city" or "politicking", and began to rule Benin from there. His foreign style of management didn't go down well with the chiefs, and they sent agents to spy on him. All this made Oranmiyan declare that only a son of the soil could cope with the attitude of the Igodomigodo people. He called the land Ile - Ibinu, meaning "Land of Vexation".

On leaving Ile-Ibinu (later Ibini, and corrupted to "Benin" by the Portuguese), he stopped briefly at Egor where he took Erinmwide, the daughter of the Enogie (or Duke) of Egor, as a wife. Eweka I was the result of this union. Oranmiyan was never to return to Benin. In his place, Eweka I became king [Oba of Benin]become known as the first Oba of Benin, the new dynasty known as the "God King". which is still ruling today.

Oranmiyan at Oyo 

After leaving Benin at about 1190, he moved north with his ever loyal entourage and settled close to the river Moshi (a tributary to the Niger River). He founded a city there, Oyo-Ile, which his descendants then expanded into the Oyo Empire. He engaged in war with the Bariba, his immediate neighbors to the north, and subsequently married Torosi, a Tapa princess, who became the mother of Sango Akata Yẹri-Yẹri. He also married Moremi Ajasoro.

Oranyan festival 
The first ever Oranyan Festival of Arts, Culture and Tourism was initiated in 2012 by his descendant and reigning successor, Oba Lamidi Adeyemi III of Oyo, who mandated that subsequently the festival was to be celebrated annually between the 8th and 15th days of the month of September in Oyo, Nigeria.

References

Alaafins of Oyo
Oonis of Ife
12th-century births
13th-century Nigerian people
Year of birth unknown
Year of death unknown
People from Ife
Yoruba warriors
13th-century monarchs in Africa
12th-century Nigerian people
12th-century monarchs in Africa
Nigerian city founders
Yoruba kings